Songi Han is an American chemist who is a professor in the Department of Chemistry and Biochemistry at the University of California, Santa Barbara. Her research considers electron and nuclear spins as sensors and detectors. She was elected a Fellow of the International Society of Magnetic Resonance in 2019 and President of the International EPR Society in 2020.

Early life and education 
Han attended the University of Koln as an undergraduate, where she majored in chemistry. She moved to the RWTH Aachen University, where she investigated magnetic resonance. She was awarded the Ampere Society Raymond Andrew Prize in 2002.

Research and career 
Han has pioneered the use of spin based approaches (including electron paramagnetic resonance, Nuclear magnetic resonance and relaxometry, to understand the structure-property relationships of biomolecules. Her work on dynamic nuclear polarization has enabled new probes for monitoring biological processes. This allows for the mapping of surface water differences around globular proteins. In collaboration with the National High Magnetic Field Laboratory, Han developed very-high field superconducting magnets.

Awards and honors 
 2004 The Camille and Henry Dreyfus Foundation Faculty Award
 2008 Packard Fellowship
 2011 National Institutes of Health Innovator Award
 2015 Alexander von Humboldt Foundation Bessel Award
 2018 Biophysical Society Innovation Award
 2020 Elected President of the International EPR Society
 2021 Eastern Analytical Symposium Award for Outstanding Achievements in Magnetic Resonance
 2021 Arnold and Mabel Beckman Foundation FIB-Milling Sample Preparation for Cellular CryoET

Selected publications

References 

Living people
RWTH Aachen University alumni
University of Cologne alumni
University of California, Santa Barbara faculty
21st-century American chemists
American women chemists
Year of birth missing (living people)
21st-century American women scientists